Abeiku Ainooson (born 24 September 1992) is a Ghanaian professional footballer, who plays as a centre back for Sekondi Hasaacas FC.

Club career
Ainooson began his professional senior club career with New Edubiase United debuting in the 2012–2013 Ghanaian Premier League season and on 1 July 2013, prior to the beginning of the 2013–2014 Ghanaian Premier League season Ainooson signed for Asante Kotoko.

International career
In November 2013, coach Maxwell Konadu invited Ainooson to be a part of the Ghana squad for the 2013 WAFU Nations Cup. Ainooson helped the Ghana national football team to a first-place finish after Ghana beat Senegal by three goals to one. In 2014, Ainooson was included in the Ghana 23-man team for the 2014 African Nations Championship that won silver.

Honours

Club 
 Asante Kotoko
 Ghana Premier League Winner: 2013–14
Ghanaian FA Cup Winner: 2013–14

National Team 

 WAFU Nations Cup Winner: 2013
 African Nations Championship Runner-up: 2014

References

External links
 
 

1992 births
Living people
Association football central defenders
Ghanaian footballers
Ghanaian expatriate footballers
New Edubiase United F.C. players
Asante Kotoko S.C. players
Al-Hilal Club (Omdurman) players
Ashanti Gold SC players
Al-Fahaheel FC players
Sekondi Hasaacas F.C. players
Ghana Premier League players
WAFU Nations Cup players
Ghana A' international footballers
2014 African Nations Championship players
Ghanaian expatriate sportspeople in Kuwait
Expatriate footballers in Kuwait
Ghana international footballers
Kuwait Premier League players